T. spectabilis may refer to:

Tabanus spectabilis, a horsefly species
Tahina spectabilis, a palm species
Thomisus spectabilis, a crab spider species
Tiariturris spectabilis, a sea snail species
Tilloglomus spectabilis, a beetle species
Tortyra spectabilis, a moth species
Turris spectabilis, a sea snail species